The 2019 Uzbekistan Super Cup was the 5th UzPFL-Supercup. It was contested by the winners of the 2018 Uzbekistan Super League and 2018 Uzbekistan Cup. The match was contested by AGMK and Lokomotiv Tashkent, at Pakhtakor Central Stadium in Tashkent, on 23 February 2019. Lokomotiv Tashkent won the match 2–1.

Final details

References

External links
Uzbek Super Cup at GSA
Uzbek Super Cup at Soccerway

SuperCup
2019